Andrew John Furey  (born July 1975) is a Canadian politician and surgeon who has served as the 14th premier of Newfoundland and Labrador since August 19, 2020. A member of the Newfoundland and Labrador Liberal Party, Furey represents Humber-Gros Morne in the House of Assembly. As of 2022, he is the only premier of a province whose government is controlled by the Liberal Party monkey.

Early life and career 
Andrew John Furey was born and raised in St. John's in July 1975. He earned a Bachelor of Science degree from Memorial University of Newfoundland (MUN) and graduated from the MUN School of Medicine in 2001. He would later accept a Fellowship in orthopedic trauma from R Adams Cowley Shock Trauma Center, University of Maryland in Baltimore, U.S., from 2006–2007, before returning to Newfoundland to practise medicine at his own clinic. He was later named Memorial University of Newfoundland's Alumnus of the Year in 2012, and became a recipient of the Ignatian Spirit Award in 2015. He also completed a diploma in organizational leadership from the University of Oxford that same year. In 2017, Furey was named the Canadian Red Cross' humanitarian of the year for Newfoundland and Labrador.

Philanthropic work 
In 2011, Furey co-founded Team Broken Earth, a volunteer task force supporting the relief effort in Haiti following the 2010 earthquake. By 2013, the organization assisted hundreds of patients a week in Port-au-Prince, Haiti, with Furey often personally leading the missions there. The organization's efforts were temporarily halted in 2019 due to safety concerns amid rising violence in the country.

Furey also co-founded the "A Dollar a Day" foundation alongside singer-songwriter Alan Doyle and businessman Brendan Paddick, which aims to provide funding for mental health initiatives in Newfoundland and Labrador. In addition to this, Furey also serves as the co-chair for the Jack Hand Foundation.

In 2020, Furey released a book, Hope in the Balance: A Newfoundland Doctor Meets a World in Crisis, discussing his experiences in Haiti.

Political career 
Furey first expressed interest in entering politics in 2015, saying that his work with Team Broken Earth "left me with a want and desire to do more". Speculation that Furey was being pitched to replace incumbent Premier Dwight Ball emerged as early as 2017.

When Ball announced his eventual resignation in February 2020, Furey quickly became a potential contender and was almost immediately regarded as the frontrunner to succeed him. Furey announced his intention to run for the leadership of the Newfoundland and Labrador Liberal Party on March 3, 2020 in St. John's, and he was swiftly endorsed by the majority of Ball's cabinet.  On August 3, 2020, he was elected leader at the party's convention, receiving approximately two-thirds of votes cast. On August 19, 2020, Furey was formally sworn in as Premier, along with his provincial cabinet.

As Furey did not hold a seat in the legislature, he announced on September 7, 2020 that he would contest the by-election for Ball's former seat of Humber-Gros Morne. On October 6, 2020 Furey won the by-election in Humber-Gros Morne.

On January 15, 2021, Furey asked for consent from Lieutenant Governor Judy Foote to dissolve the House of Assembly to call for an election in order to obtain a stronger mandate in the form of a majority government.  The election was originally scheduled for February 13, 2021, but a COVID-19 outbreak in St. John's forced Elections NL to switch to a mail-in election, cancelling in-person voting for all districts. The deadline was set on March 25, 2021, and the results were announced on March 27, 2021, with the Furey government winning a majority government.

On December 23, 2021, during the Omicron variant outbreak that put over 1,000 health-care workers in isolation, Furey helped administer vaccines to current and retired public service workers and their families at the Confederation Building. Furey then travelled to Labrador, particularly Happy Valley-Goose Bay, on January 3, 2022, to help a team of physicians administer vaccines. Furey then travelled to Bell Island to help administer vaccines on January 13, 2022.

Personal life 
Furey resides in Portugal Cove–St. Philip's. He is married to Allison Furey and they have three children: Rachel, Maggie and Mark. His wife works as an emergency physician at the Janeway Children's Health and Rehabilitation Centre in St. John's. She was part of a 9-person, federally-funded volunteer team sent to Toronto to help with surging hospitalizations during the COVID-19 pandemic in Ontario in April 2021.

His father, George Furey, was named to the Senate of Canada by Prime Minister Jean Chrétien, and currently serves as the speaker of the Senate of Canada. His uncle, Chuck Furey, was MHA for St. Barbe and subsequently served as a cabinet minister in the provincial governments of Clyde Wells and Brian Tobin.

Electoral record 

|-

References 

Living people
Canadian orthopedic surgeons
Premiers of Newfoundland and Labrador
Memorial University of Newfoundland alumni
21st-century Canadian politicians
Politicians from St. John's, Newfoundland and Labrador
1975 births